Carleson may refer to:

Mathematics
 Carleson measure, a mathematical method applied to dimensional space
 Carleson's inequality, a generalisation of Carleman's inequality
 Carleson–Jacobs theorem, a function applied to the unit of a circle

People
 Carleson, a Swedish surname

See also

Charleson